XHSCAP-FM is a community radio station on 107.7 FM in Miahuatlán de Porfirio Díaz, Oaxaca. The station is owned by the civil association Soley Sin Barreras, A.C.

History
Soley Sin Barreras filed for a community station on October 12, 2016. The station's award was approved on May 23, 2018, and XHSCAP went on the air February 14, 2019.

References

Radio stations in Oaxaca
Community radio stations in Mexico
Former pirate radio stations
Radio stations established in 2019